Aami Montri Hobo is a 2011 Bengali film directed by Partha Chakraborty and produced by Goutam Naskar.

Cast
 Debraj Ray
 Kharaj Mukherjee
 Manasi Sinha
 Anamika Saha
 Dulal Lahiri
 Shakuntala Barua

References

External links
 Aami Montri Hobo at the Gomolo
Bengali-language Indian films
2010s Bengali-language films
2011 films